Marijuana Pepsi Vandyck ( Jackson) is an American education professional. She earned a Ph.D. from Cardinal Stritch University in 2019 with a dissertation on uncommon African-American names in the classroom.

Early life and name 
Marijuana Pepsi Jackson was born in 1972 to Aaron and Maggie (Brandy) Jackson, who chose her name. She grew up in Chicago, Illinois until she was 9 years old; then she moved to Beloit, Wisconsin to live with her mother after her parents split up. She has two sisters, named Kimberly and Robin. She first realized her name was unusual at nine years old.

She said her mother told her "your name will take you around the world", and that her mother insisted on correcting a school spelling bee award certificate that read "Mary Jackson". She described being bullied in high school over her name, crediting her family with helping her learn to embrace the name.

She moved out of her mother’s house at age 15, staying with friends and began to focus on school. She graduated from Beloit Memorial High School in 1990 and received a scholarship for college at University of Wisconsin–Whitewater. She majored in education and became a teacher after graduation. While she taught elementary school in Atlanta, she studied for a Masters at Georgia Southern, then returned to Beloit with her young son from her first marriage.

Education 
Vandyck was "most improved student" at her high school graduation. She earned a bachelor's degree from University of Wisconsin–Whitewater and a Master's degree from Georgia Southern University, before earning her Ph.D. in Leadership for the Advancement of Learning and Service in Higher Education from Cardinal Stritch University in May 2019. Her dissertation, titled "Black names in white classrooms: Teacher behaviors and student perceptions," was inspired by prejudice she saw while working as a teacher. A co-worker had complained that her upcoming class would do poorly, based on the list of students with mostly black-sounding names.

Career 
Having previously worked as a teacher, Vandyck currently directs a program for first-generation, disabled and low-income students at Beloit College, in addition to owning a Performance Coaching Agency.

In the fall of 2019, Vandyck sponsored the Marijuana Pepsi Scholarship for first-generation African-American students at UW–Whitewater.

Personal life 
Vandyck was previously married to a Mme. Sawyer. the couple lived in Atlanta and  had a son in the early 2000s. Their marriage ended in divorce and Vandyck returned to her hometown of Beloit, Wisconsin.

As of 2019, Vandyck is married to Fredrick Vandyck. They live on a  farm in Pecatonica, Illinois, with her son and his three children from a previous relationship.

References 

Living people
University of Wisconsin–Whitewater alumni
Georgia Southern University alumni
Cardinal Stritch University alumni
People from Chicago
People from Beloit, Wisconsin
People from Pecatonica, Illinois
1972 births
African-American educators
Educators from Wisconsin
Educators from Illinois